Houlle is a commune in the Pas-de-Calais department in the Hauts-de-France region of France.

Geography
A village situated 5 miles (8 km) northwest of Saint-Omer, on the D207 road. "Houlle" is also the name of a small river close to the village, tributary of the Aa, included in the water management plan (:fr:SAGE) of the Audomarois region.

Economy

Spirits from grain, flavoured with berries of the juniper tree, are distilled in Houlle, the Genièvre (juniper) of Houlle; this spirit is very close to the Dutch jenever and more distantly related to dry gin. This is drunk with the local speciality, (potjevleesch) and is used to refine Maroilles cheese.

Population

Places of interest
 The church of St. John the Baptiste, dating from the twelfth century.
 Some 18th-century wells.

See also
 Communes of the Pas-de-Calais department

References

External links

 Website on local products 

Communes of Pas-de-Calais